The 2016 United States presidential election in Arkansas was held on Tuesday, November 8, 2016, as part of the 2016 United States presidential election in which all 50 states plus the District of Columbia participated. Arkansas voters chose electors to represent them in the Electoral College via a popular vote, pitting the Republican Party's nominee, businessman Donald Trump, and running mate Indiana Governor Mike Pence against Democratic Party nominee, former Secretary of State Hillary Clinton, and her running mate Virginia Senator Tim Kaine. Arkansas has six electoral votes in the Electoral College.

Although Clinton once served as the First Lady of Arkansas for 12 years as the wife of then Governor of Arkansas Bill Clinton, Arkansas was considered to be a state Trump would win or otherwise a safe red state. Bill Clinton won the state twice in 1992 and 1996, but the state has trended Republican in every election since 2000. Trump won the state with 60.57% of the vote, and Hillary Clinton received 33.65% of the vote. The Republican candidate has carried Arkansas in every election since 2000. This is also the first election in which the state simultaneously voted for a Republican presidential candidate and an incumbent Republican Senate candidate. Additionally, Arkansas was one of eleven states that voted twice for Bill Clinton in 1992 and 1996 that Hillary Clinton lost in 2016.

Trump's 60.57% share of the vote is tied with Mitt Romney's 60.57% in 2012, making both candidates' performances the best result for the Republicans in Arkansas since Richard Nixon in 1972. However, Trump bested Romney in terms of margin, winning by 26.92% versus Romney's 23.69%. The Prohibition Party candidate, James Hedges, also had the notable achievement of finishing third in Arkansas County, ahead of major third-party candidates Gary Johnson and Jill Stein, the only county in the country where he did so.

Primary elections
On March 1, 2016, in the presidential primaries,  Arkansas voters expressed their preferences for the Democratic, Republican, Green, Libertarian, Constitution, and Prohibition parties' respective nominees for president. Registered members of each party only voted in their party's primary, while voters who were unaffiliated chose any one primary in which to vote.

Democratic primary

Opinion polling

Results

Primary date: March 1, 2016
National delegates: 37

Republican primary

Twelve candidates appeared on the Republican presidential primary ballot:

General election

Polling

Predictions
The following are final 2016 predictions from various organizations for Arkansas as of Election Day.

Statewide results

Results by county

Counties that flipped from Democratic to Republican
 Woodruff (largest city: Augusta)

By congressional district
Trump won all four of the state's congressional districts.

Turnout
The voter turnout in Arkansas was 64.65% with 1,137,772 ballots cast out of 1,759,974 registered voters.

See also
 United States presidential elections in Arkansas
 2016 Democratic Party presidential debates and forums
 2016 Democratic Party presidential primaries
 2016 Republican Party presidential debates and forums
 2016 Republican Party presidential primaries

References

External links
 RNC 2016 Republican Nominating Process 
 Green papers for 2016 primaries, caucuses, and conventions
 Decision Desk Headquarter Results for Arkansas

AR
2016
United States presidential